Pali Chandra, (Born 19 November 1967) is a Kathak Exponent, Choreographer, Digital Dance Educator, Mentor and Artistic Director. Intensively trained in the field of Kathak, she now propagates Dance Education through various channels. She has established several studios specialising in Kathak Training Programs in the United Kingdom, United Arab Emirates, India and Switzerland. She has directed 14 Art Festivals in various continents. She is the Co-Founder for the portal learnkathakonline and Course Director of Kathak for natyasutraonline with Invis Multimedia.

Pali is a committee member of the Imperial Society of Teachers of Dancing, and a graded member of the Indian Council for Cultural Relations.

Early life 
Born and raised in Lucknow, the capital of Uttar Pradesh.

 Father: Dwarka Nath Srivastava - A retired senior officer of Reserve Bank Of India and NABARD. Based in Lucknow for most part of his life.
 Mother: Usha Srivasatava  - an accomplished singer of Hindutani Classical Music from Faizabad.
 Sibling: Somna Tugnai

Personal life 
Pali is married to Vishal Chandra and has twin sons. They live together in Schinznach Bad in Aargau, Switzerland.

Education 
 Masters Degree in Anthropology - Gold Medalist from Lucknow University in 1991 for her research on tribal music and dance of Gaddis tribe Pali Chandra,".
 Bachelors of Arts Economics and Anthropology from Avadh Girl’s Degree College, Lucknow
 Did her schooling at Loreto Convent, Lucknow

Dance Training
Pali Chandra started dancing at the age of six.  Trained under her guru Vikram Singhe Sangeet Natak Akademi, and Kapila Raj as well as Ram Mohan Mishra  for 13 years at Kathak Kendra Lucknow.

Career 

She is a senior member of the Imperial Society of Teachers of Dancing, U.K. and a graded member of the Indian Council for Cultural Relations. She has designed and executed workshops for institutes such as Oxford University, Birmingham University and Bradford University. Pali Chandra’s Kathak dance portal learnkathakonline has 300,000 subscriptions in the last 4 years.

The first of 4 Gurukul Studios was founded in 2008 in Dubai where Pali Chandra is a guru, mentor and guide to 550 students learning and performing Kathak whilst following the ISTD - UK (Imperial Society for Teachers of Dancing - United Kingdom)  syllabus.  Besides providing dance training, she is the Founder and Artistic Director of Swiss International Kathak Festival (2019), 11 Dance Festivals called Dancing Divas (2009-2019) and several production in UK, UAE and India.

Under the banner of Pali Peacocks, UK, Pali has been honored at the House of Commons in London as the Best Art Director for her production ‘In the Shadow of the Hills´. The Arts Council of England and London Arts Board, amongst other Institutions & Organizations, have frequently funded her projects.

Social Activist 
Pali Chandra is known for her contribution to the society and environment and has taken several charity initiatives since 1995. From awareness programs on people with special needs to the homeless of Harrow in UK. From giving company to the lonely in old age homes of Belmont Elderly Centre to dancing with the physically challenged of Aspire, Stanmore. She has organised fundraisers in Dubai, Bangalore and Chennai. Pali has led several projects to help raise awareness towards the environment like Ganges to Thames and Continental Shift and is now working towards a series of production aimed at empowering women.

In Dubai, she has worked closely with the management of SNF (Special Needs Foundation) and Al Noor to raise awareness and funds.

Productions and Choreographies 
 Continental Shift  London, England (1994)
 Ganges to Thames  London, England (1996)
 In the Shadow of the Hills  London, England (1999)
 Kamoshi ki Avaaz  London, England (2001)
 She  UK Tour (2002)
 Gazal in Restropect  London, England (2003)
 Rhythm Shift  London, England (2004)
 Five Elements  Dubai, UAE (2010)
 Sufi Noor  Dubai, UAE (2012)
 Across  Dubai, UAE
 Essence of Life, India (2013)
 Naach - Hundred years of Bollywood  Dubai, UAE (2014) 
 Zinda  Dubai, UAE 
 Navinayika  Dubai, UAE (2015)
  Taal Mala  Dubai, UAE (2016)
 Noor ki Baarish  Dubai, UAE (2016)
  Soney ki Chidya  Lebanon (2017)
 Aamad  Bangalore, India (2017), Nehru Centre London, England (2018)
 Lasya  Dubai, UAE (2018)
 Kahani  Dubai, UAE (2019)
 Play with a Cause - Parkinson  Dubai, UAE (2019)
 Thaat  Bangalore, India (2019)
 Tihai  Bangalore, India (2020)
 Shyam Piya  Zurich, Switzerland (2019)
 Repertoire  London, England (2018) & Aargau, Switzerland (2019)
 Dance to Empower  Switzerland (work in progress)

Awards

References

External links 
 palichandra.org Official Website
 palichandra.org/gurukul Official Gurukul Studios Website
 learnkathakonline.com/ Online Kathak Learning Platform (Co-Founder)

1967 births
Living people
Indian female classical dancers
Performers of Indian classical dance
Kathak exponents
Indian classical choreographers
Indian women choreographers
Indian choreographers
Artists from Lucknow
Dancers from Uttar Pradesh
Women artists from Uttar Pradesh
20th-century Indian women artists